The golden cuckooshrike (Campochaera sloetii) is a species of bird in the family Campephagidae. It is monotypic within the genus Campochaera.
It is found in New Guinea.
Its natural habitat is subtropical or tropical moist lowland forests.

References

External links
Image at ADW 

golden cuckooshrike
Birds of New Guinea
golden cuckooshrike
Taxonomy articles created by Polbot